Diane Corner OBE (born 29 September 1959) is a former British diplomat who is deputy head of the United Nations Multidimensional Integrated Stabilization Mission in the Central African Republic (MINUSCA).

Career
Diane Louise Corner was educated at Winchester County High School for Girls, Peter Symonds College and the University of Bristol. She holds degrees in both French and Politics. She joined the Foreign and Commonwealth Office (FCO) in 1982 and served at Kuala Lumpur, Berlin, Harare and in the Cabinet Office on secondment, as well as in the FCO. In 2000 she completed the Senior Course at the NATO Defence College in Rome. She was acting High Commissioner to Sierra Leone 2008–09, High Commissioner to Tanzania 2009–13 and Ambassador to the Democratic Republic of Congo and Republic of Congo 2013–14. She was appointed to her present post in July 2014 by United Nations Secretary-General Ban Ki-moon as his Deputy Special Representative. which she left in June 2017. She was appointed Officer of the Order of the British Empire (OBE) in the 2018 Birthday Honours list.

References

1959 births
Living people
British women ambassadors
People educated at Peter Symonds College
Alumni of the University of Bristol
High Commissioners of the United Kingdom to Tanzania
Ambassadors of the United Kingdom to the Democratic Republic of the Congo
Ambassadors of the United Kingdom to the Republic of the Congo
British officials of the United Nations
Officers of the Order of the British Empire
High Commissioners of the United Kingdom to Sierra Leone
Consuls-General of the United Kingdom to Jerusalem
NATO Defense College alumni